Henrick is a surname. Notable people with the surname include:

Katie Henrick (born 1980), English snooker and pool player
Richard P. Henrick (born 1951), American novelist and screenwriter
Ross Henrick (1954–2005), Australian rugby league player

See also
Henric
Henricks